Boundétingou Airport  is a public use airport located near Natitingou, Atakora, Benin.

References

External links 
 Airport record for Boundétingou Airport at Landings.com

Airports in Benin
Atakora Department